Memory Cove is a bay located on the East coast of Jussieu Peninsula on Eyre Peninsula in South Australia approximately  South-East of Port Lincoln.

It is one of the natural features named by Matthew Flinders in memory of the eight crew who were lost on a cutter that capsized sometime after being launched from HM Sloop Investigator to search for water on 21 February 1802.

Since 2004, the coastline enclosing the bay has been part of the Memory Cove Wilderness Protection Area.

References

External links
Memory Cove Wilderness Protection Area homepage

Bays of South Australia
Eyre Peninsula
Spencer Gulf
Coves of Australia